Saint Lucia Olympic Committee (IOC code: LCA) is the National Olympic Committee representing Saint Lucia. It is also the body responsible for Saint Lucia's representation at the Olympic Games.

History 
Saint Lucia Olympic Committee was founded in 1987 and recognised by the International Olympic Committee in 1993.

See also
Saint Lucia at the Olympics
Saint Lucia at the Commonwealth Games

References

External links
 Official website

Saint Lucia
Saint Lucia
Oly
Saint Lucia at the Olympics
Sports organizations established in 1993